Clement Llewellyn Davies (December 3, 1890 – December 21, 1951) was a Canadian Christian minister and recruiter for the Ku Klux Klan (KKK). Davies pastored Centennial Church in Victoria, British Columbia through the 1920s where he preached British Israelism and an early version of Christian Identity Theology. He became affiliated with the KKK by the early 1920s and recruited members though his church. In the 1930, Davies spent time in the area of Milwaukee, Wisconsin preaching. In 1933, he began to travel and speak regularly outside the 1933 Chicago World's Fair where he promoted the Christian Identity Theology and defended the KKK. Davies was a speaker at the Anglo-Saxon Federation Meeting in March 1940 that was organized by Gordon Lindsay in Vancouver, British Columbia.

Davies began traveling and ministering in the United States and Canada throughout the 1940s through the sponsorship of Tatos Kardashian. During 1947, Kardashian sponsored joint events featuring both Davis and Avok Hagopian, an Iranian faith healer with the same sponsors. The pair traveled the United States holding joint appearances.

Sources

Canadian Ku Klux Klan members
1890 births
1951 deaths